Selenetherium is an extinct genus of elephantid.

References

Prehistoric elephants
Prehistoric placental genera
Pliocene mammals of Africa
Fossil taxa described in 2005
Pliocene proboscideans